Harry "Pep" Clark (March 20, 1883 – June 8, 1965) was a Major League Baseball third baseman. In 15 career games, he had 20 hits in 65 at-bats. He batted and threw right-handed.

Clark was born in Union City, Ohio and died in Milwaukee, Wisconsin.

External links

1883 births
1965 deaths
Chicago White Sox players
Major League Baseball third basemen
Dallas Giants players
Milwaukee Brewers (minor league) players
Milwaukee Brewers (minor league) managers
Burials in Wisconsin
People from Union City, Ohio